Yuri Olegovich Ulyumdzhiyev (born 20 December 1982) is a former Russian football player.

References

1982 births
Living people
Russian footballers
FC Zhemchuzhina Sochi players
FC Elista players
Russian Premier League players
Association football forwards
FC Tom Tomsk players
FC Mashuk-KMV Pyatigorsk players